Guardabosone is a comune (municipality) in the Province of Vercelli in the Italian region Piedmont, located about  northeast of Turin and about  northwest of Vercelli.

Guardabosone borders the following municipalities: Ailoche, Borgosesia, Caprile, Crevacuore, Postua, Scopa, Scopello, and Serravalle Sesia.

References

Cities and towns in Piedmont